Dr. Kerry Pawluski is a Canadian medical doctor and pilot based in Edmonton, Alberta, Canada. Dr. Pawluski is the founding director of Angel Flight Alberta, the Alberta chapter of a broader group of Canadian Angel Flight providers. Having practiced rural medicine Dr. Pawluski is a strong advocate for a patient's right to speedy and convenient access to tertiary care through Medevac and Air Ambulance services. In doing so Dr. Pawluski has opposed Edmonton City Council's decision to permanently close the Edmonton City Centre Airport.

See also 
 Rural Health
 Northern Alberta

References

Edmonton - Oliver Primary Care Network, List of Members

Year of birth missing (living people)
Living people
People from Edmonton
Physicians from Alberta